The 1992 United States Senate election in Nevada was held on November 3, 1992. Although nearly 10% of the electorate voted for neither of the two major U.S. political parties, incumbent Democratic U.S. Senator Harry Reid won re-election to a second term with over 50% of the vote.

Democratic primary

Candidates
 Harry Reid, incumbent U.S. Senator
 Charles Woods, Perennial Candidate
 Norman E. Hollingsworth, businessman

Results

Republican primary

Candidates
Demar Dahl, cattle rancher and President of Nevada Cattlemen's Association
Bob Gore
Pro-Life Anderson, activist
Patrick Matthew "Pat" Fitzpatrick
Sam M. Cavnar
Kirby Vanburch

Results

General election

Candidates
 Harry Reid (D), incumbent U.S. Senator
 Demar Dahl (R), cattle rancher and President of Nevada Cattlemen's Association

Results

See also
 1992 United States Senate elections

References

Nevada
1990
1992 Nevada elections